2014 Shenzhen Open – Doubles may refer to:

2014 ATP Shenzhen Open – Doubles
2014 WTA Shenzhen Open – Doubles

See also 

2014 Shenzhen Open